Huw William Merriman (born 13 July 1973) is a British politician who has been the Member of Parliament (MP) for Bexhill and Battle in East Sussex since the 2015 general election. A member of the Conservative Party, he has served as Minister of State for Rail and HS2 since October 2022. He previously chaired the Transport Select Committee between January 2020 and October 2022. Prior to his parliamentary career, Merriman was a barrister and a local councillor.

Early life and career
Merriman was born on 13 July 1973 in Brackley, Northamptonshire, England to Richard and Ann Merriman. His father was a local council worker and his mother was a teacher. He grew up in Buckingham and attended Buckingham County Secondary Modern School and Aylesbury College. Merriman studied law at Durham University, where he was president of the Young Conservatives branch in 1994. After graduating, he qualified as a barrister at the City Law School. He initially worked in criminal law before working in financial law for 17 years. His last role was as managing director of a team of lawyers tasked with unwinding the Lehman Brothers' European estate following the financial services firm's collapse in 2008.

Political career
He moved to East Sussex in 2006 and was elected to Wealden District Council for the Rotherfield ward in 2007 and was re-elected in 2011. Merriman stood as a Conservative candidate for North East Derbyshire in the 2010 general election. He came second to the incumbent Labour MP Natascha Engel.

Merriman was selected as the prospective parliamentary candidate (PPC) for Bexhill and Battle in November 2014. Other contenders for the seat included future MPs Suella Fernandes (now Braverman) and James Cleverly. He won the seat in the 2015 general election with 30,245 votes and a majority of 20,075 (36.4%). During the 2015–2017 parliament, he sat on the Procedure Committee. From July 2017 to August 2018, he was a parliamentary private secretary (PPS) in the Department for Work and Pensions. Merriman was appointed as PPS to then Chancellor of the Exchequer Philip Hammond.

He supported the UK remaining within the European Union (EU) in the 2016 UK EU membership referendum. Merriman voted for then Prime Minister Theresa May's Brexit withdrawal agreement in early 2019. In the indicative votes held on 27 March, he voted for a referendum on the Brexit withdrawal agreement.

Merriman supported Jeremy Hunt in the 2019 Conservative Party leadership election. He voted for Prime Minister Boris Johnson's Brexit withdrawal agreement in October 2019.

Merriman was the chair of the Transport Select Committee between January 2020 and October 2022. He had previously been a member of the committee since September 2017 and was also a member of the Liaison Committee between May 2020 and October 2022. Merriman was appointed as Minister of State for Rail and HS2 in October 2022.

Personal life
Merriman married Victoria Powdrill in 2001 and they have three daughters. They separated in 2019.

References

External links

1973 births
Conservative Party (UK) MPs for English constituencies
Living people
UK MPs 2015–2017
UK MPs 2017–2019
UK MPs 2019–present
Alumni of University College, Durham
People from Brackley
People from Rotherfield